The Diocese of Khahlamba is a diocese in the Anglican Church of Southern Africa.

History
In 2009 the Diocese of Grahamstown was divided and the Diocese of Ukhahlamba sprung from that division. The current bishop of the diocese is The Right Reverend Moses Madywabe. The mother church of the diocese is the Cathedral of St Michael and All Angels in Queenstown, Eastern Cape. The Very Reverend Siyabonga Sibeko is the second dean of the diocese and the rector of the cathedral parish. Vuyolwethu Chulayo together with Hlumokuhle Gogela pioneered the growth of the Altar Servers Guild in the Diocese.

In 2017, then-ordinand, Vuyolwethu Chulayo made history by being the first ordinand in that Diocese to be fundeded by the Archbishop of the Anglican Church of Southern Africa.

List of bishops
 Mazwi Ernest Tisani 2009 - 2017
 Moses Thozamile Madywabe 2018 - present

References

External links
 

2009 establishments in South Africa
Anglican Church of Southern Africa dioceses
Christian organizations established in 2009
Anglican bishops of Ukhahlamba